Mark Anthony Philippoussis (born 7 November 1976) is an Australian tennis  coach and former professional tennis player of Greek and Italian descent. Philippoussis' greatest achievements are winning two Davis Cup titles with Australia in 1999 and 2003, winning the deciding rubber in the final of each. He also reached the final of the 1998 US Open and the 2003 Wimbledon singles tournaments. Philippoussis reached a career-high singles ranking of world No. 8.

Philippoussis has had a minor career in modelling and starred in the American reality television dating show Age of Love. He is nicknamed 'the Scud', after the Scud missile. He is also known in Australia as “The Pou”.

Biography

Early career
Philippoussis was born in Melbourne to a Greek father, Nikolaos ("Nick"), and an Italian mother, Rossana; and was educated at Maribyrnong College and later at Wesley College. He is of the Catholic faith.

Coached by his father, Nick, the right-hander has played tennis since he was six years of age. He was an Australian Institute of Sport scholarship holder. He was briefly coached by former 1987 Wimbledon champion Pat Cash, which ended in an acrimonious split in 2000. In 1994, he finished third in singles ranking for juniors. Philippoussis also finished as junior doubles champion with Ben Ellwood in Australia, Wimbledon, and Italy. He turned professional in 1994.

In 1995, at the age of 19, he was the youngest player in the year-end top 50. In 1996, he reached the 4th round of the Australian Open upsetting Pete Sampras in the 3rd round and in doubles with Patrick Rafter. On 25 May 1997, he recorded a personal best 229.0 km/h (142.3 mph) serve in a game he lost to Albert Costa. During the height of his career, Philippoussis was known as having one of the fastest serves in the game.

Rise to top 10
At the 1998 US Open U.S. Open, Philippoussis reached his first Grand Slam final, losing to fellow Australian Patrick Rafter. In January 1999, Philippoussis and Jelena Dokić won the Hopman Cup for Australia, defeating Sweden's Åsa Carlsson and Jonas Björkman in the final tie. This was the first time that Australia won the Hopman Cup and the only time until Nick Kyrgios and Daria Gavrilova won in January 2016.

On March 14 1999, Mark Philippoussis defeated Carlos Moyá, 5–7, 6–4, 6–4, 4–6, 6–2 in final of Indian Wells Masters.
On 29 March 1999, Philippoussis entered the top 10 for the first time and stayed there for 10 weeks. He advanced to the quarter-finals at Wimbledon in 1999 for the second straight year, where he retired in the second set against Sampras after having won the first set. During that match, Philippoussis suffered a moderate cartilage tear in his left knee and underwent arthroscopic surgery four days later. Sampras later remarked that he "dodged a bullet out there". Philippoussis returned to professional tennis seven weeks later at the Indianapolis Tennis Championships and lost his second-round match after receiving a bye in the first round. He did not play again until October in Singapore, where he lost in the second round. He finished 1999 at No. 19.

2000 was the fourth consecutive year in which Philippoussis finished in the top 20, at No. 11. He reached the fourth round at the Australian Open, losing to eventual champion Andre Agassi. He defeated No. 2 Sampras 8–6 in the fifth set at the French Open in a first-round match, but lost in the fourth round to Juan Carlos Ferrero. For the third consecutive year, he made it to the quarterfinals at Wimbledon, losing again to Agassi. He appeared in his second Olympic Games in Sydney, losing in the third round to eventual gold medalist Yevgeny Kafelnikov.

Philippoussis finished 2002 in the top 100 (seventh time in eight years), despite not winning a title. He moved from Miami to the San Diego area in September 2002.

Davis Cup
Philippoussis has always claimed to be proud of representing his country in Davis Cup, but personal differences with John Newcombe and Tony Roche interfered with his commitment early in his career. Despite several highly publicised feuds, Philippoussis played a large part in giving Australia their 27th Davis Cup triumph—second only to the United States with 31—but it was their first since 1986. In 1999 he defeated Cédric Pioline, 6–3, 5–7, 6–1, 6–2, in Nice, France.

Injuries plagued Philippoussis's availability for Davis Cup and was the cause of a public rift between team-mates Patrick Rafter and Lleyton Hewitt. Rafter publicly accused Philippoussis of jerking the team around after he withdrew from a Davis Cup tie in late 2000. Philippoussis said Rafter was ill-informed and upset by the lack of support and understanding from his team-mates.

Knee surgeries forced Philippoussis out of Davis Cup until February 2003. By then, Pat Rafter had retired, and John Fitzgerald and Wally Masur were the new Davis Cup captain and coach. Philippoussis sealed victory for Australia in the Melbourne Final against Spain. Philippoussis beat Spain's Juan Carlos Ferrero in a 7–5, 6–3, 1–6, 2–6, 6–0 battle. Philippoussis suffered a pectoral tear at the end of the second set, which caused him to lose the third and fourth sets. He regrouped in the fifth set and beat Ferrero 6–0.

2003: Comeback

After three knee operations, Philippoussis embarked on a protracted comeback. He made himself available regularly for Davis Cup, hired a new physical trainer, and took up surfing as his new recreation. He made the 2003 Wimbledon final, finally losing to Roger Federer, 6–7(5), 2–6, 6–7(3).

During a 2003 Wimbledon tennis match against Andre Agassi (6–3, 2–6, 6–7 (4–7), 6–3, 6–4), he set a new Australian tennis record of 46 aces served in a match, three aces short of the overall ATP Tour record then held by Richard Krajicek.

Philippoussis broke a two-year singles-title drought by winning the Shanghai Open in 2003. On 30 November 2003, he defeated Juan Carlos Ferrero of Spain to win the fourth match of the Davis Cup final in Melbourne, securing the title for Australia. At the end of 2003, Philippoussis received the ATP Comeback Player of the Year award.

The honeymoon period with the Australian public, however, did not last. 2004 proved a disastrous year in terms of his tennis career and public profile. After shouldering most of the blame for losing Australia's Davis Cup tie with Sweden with an unexpected below-par performance, Philippoussis struggled through to the Wimbledon fourth round in June 2004. From Wimbledon in June until the end of the season in October, he failed to win a single ATP tennis match and finished with one of his lowest rankings since turning professional in 1994.

In October 2004, a much-publicised affair with Delta Goodrem had soured and seriously damaged his standing, after newspapers alleged that he had dated Paris Hilton while with Goodrem. In March 2005, he became engaged to actress and model Alexis Barbara. The Age reported the pair had split in July 2006, but Philippoussis denied this to Australian tabloid New Idea; they did split some time before he began filming Age of Love.

He confirmed to Sydney's Daily Telegraph on 23 August 2006, that he "parted ways with" his father as his coach and rehired Peter McNamara in an attempt to revive his career.

2006: Return

After some controversy over his wildcard selection after a disappointing 2006 Australian Open, Philippoussis made more headlines when he again earned entry into the 2006 Wimbledon. He was defeated in the second round.

Leading into the Campbell's Hall of Fame Championships as a wildcard, his record was a modest 6–7. He had a fantastic run in the tournament, getting to the final, where he defeated Justin Gimelstob in straight sets to claim his first title in almost three years.

Philippoussis, then ranked No. 114, lost to Rafael Nadal as a wildcard entry in the first round of the 2006 US Open. The Australian Davis Cup team lost against Argentina in an unpredictable 5–0. On 22 September, Philippoussis was defeated by David Nalbandian 4–6, 3–6, 3–6, in the first match of the series.

Philippoussis played in a series of Challenger tournaments after the Davis Cup semifinals. Philippoussis won the Calabasas tournament, defeating Amer Delic, 6–7(4–7), 7–6(7–4), 6–3, in the final.

2007
Philippoussis beat Russian Dmitry Tursunov, 6–4, 7–6, at the 2007 Hopman Cup. However, during his second match against Jérôme Haehnel, he was forced to retire after hyperextending his knee. An MRI showed that he had torn cartilage in his knee, forcing him to miss the rest of the season.

2008
Philippoussis acquired a protected ranking of No. 119 and was allowed to use that ranking for entry into eight tournaments. Tennis Australia, not being happy with his lack of matchplay and unwillingness to play the Australian Open wildcard playoff, told him that he would not be given any special treatment and would have to earn his wildcard. This forced him to use one of his protected ranking tournament entries.

In his first match of the Australian Open Wildcard playoff, he was drawn against reigning Australian Open juniors champion Brydan Klein and had a fiery contest. After a remark from Klein, Philippoussis was quoted as saying, "You say that to me again and you're in trouble; you're not playing juniors any more." He came out the victor in straight sets, 6–3, 7–5, and thus began his comeback in good form. Philippoussis then lost his second match to Sam Groth, 4–6, 3–6, but due to other players' injuries, he advanced to the quarterfinals, where he was to play Rameez Junaid. However, due to another knee injury requiring surgery, Philippoussis was unable to play.

2010
Philippousis appeared in a pro tour match for the first time since November 2006, when he lost to fifth seed Michael Yani, 4–6, 4–6, in the first round of the Challenger of Dallas. Philippousis also competed in some of the events on the Champions Series, winning two tournaments and topping the rankings for 2010.

2012
Philippoussis has played for the Philadelphia Freedoms of World Team Tennis this summer. The Freedoms used the No. 1 overall pick to draft Philippoussis, who previously played for the team in 2002. He was the team's marquee player on 25 July 2012 when they faced the Boston Lobsters and travelled with the team to their matches against the Sacramento Capitals and Orange County Breakers.

2015: Return to ATP World Tour

Philippoussis contested his first match on the ATP World Tour in nine years since winning the 2006 Newport title, after receiving a wild card into the qualifying rounds of the 2015 Hall of Fame Tennis Championships at 38 years of age.
He lost to Eric Quigley 6–7(1), 6–7(4). Philippoussis also played doubles in the tournament with Ryan Harrison, winning the first round to make it to the quarter-finals before losing to the second seeds Austin Krajicek and Rajeev Ram.
Afterwards, Philippousis said: "It was just about playing one event. There’s no talk about a comeback. Down the line if I see something, maybe close to California, I might do that. It’s one event and that’s it."

2017
Philippoussis won the 2017 RPIA Championships in Toronto, defeating Andy Roddick in the finals.

Equipment
In early 2000s, Philippoussis wore apparel manufactured by Fila on court, and used Dunlop 200G racquet.

Television
In 2020, Philippoussis competed as the 'Echidna' in the second season of The Masked Singer Australia and was the first contestant eliminated, placing 12th overall.

Age of Love

Philippoussis starred as the bachelor in the reality television dating show Age of Love on the NBC television network, in June 2007.

The show centred around women in or near their 40s and women in their 20s competing for his affection. At first Philippoussis, unaware of the special format of the show, was shocked at the ages of the "cougars" as the older women were called. He was shocked again after learning he would also be dating younger women ("kittens"). The final dates occurred in his hometown of Melbourne, Australia, including a date at Moonlit Sanctuary. In the end, Philippoussis chose Amanda Salinas (the 25-year-old Nashville Predators dancer) because it "wouldn't work out" with Jen, the 48-year-old assistant to Jerry Buss.

Personal life
In 2004, he began a nine-month relationship with Australian singer Delta Goodrem. Her "comeback" single, "Out of the Blue", was written about his support during her cancer battle. The couple's relationship ended in controversy when newspapers reported Philippoussis had been unfaithful.

In May 2009, Philippoussis declared that all his money was gone and that he would lose his home of residence. In a writ lodged with the Supreme Court on 15 May 2009, it was alleged Philippoussis took out a loan through his company Mergis Pty Ltd which he personally guaranteed. The writ claims Mergis – of which Philippoussis is the sole director, secretary and shareholder – defaulted less than a year later. The lender is seeking $1,313,351.96, plus interest, costs and possession of the house, or is threatening to go to trial. The Perpetual Trustee Company Ltd is listed in court documents as the plaintiff, but a company spokesman said her firm had provided funds to another company which was the one foreclosing. The other company is not detailed on the writ, but Philippoussis said it was Pepper Home Loans – a company that provides loans through mortgage brokers. Philippoussis took out a mortgage in February 2008. He said he was three months behind, adding that each monthly payment was more than $10,000. "I haven't played tennis since 2006, and tennis is one of those sports where if you don't play, you don't get paid", he said.

Later in 2009, while in the US attempting to restart his tennis career, he dated and was engaged to actress Jennifer Esposito but the engagement ended a year later.

Philippoussis' former stepmother is Yan Cui.

He married Romanian-born model Silvana Lovin in September 2013. Lovin gave birth to their first child, a boy, in 2014, and had their second child, a girl, in 2018.

Major finals

Grand Slam finals

Singles: 2 (2 runner-ups)

Masters Series finals

Singles: 2 (1 title, 1 runner-up)

Career finals

Singles: 22 (11 titles, 11 runner-ups)

Doubles: 6 (3 titles, 3 runner-ups)

Team competition: 3 (3 titles)

Performance timeline

Singles

1This event was held in Stockholm through 1994, Essen in 1995, and Stuttgart from 1996 through 2001.

Top 10 wins

References

Article - CNN

Article - The Australian

External links
 
 
 
 
 AussieProfiles.com: Mark Philippoussis
 TheAge.com.au – Feature article
 Sport.Guardian.uk – Featuring biography of Mark Philippoussis

1976 births
Australian people of Greek descent
Australian people of Italian descent
Australian expatriate sportspeople in the United States
Australian male tennis players
Australian Roman Catholics
Australian Open (tennis) junior champions
Grand Slam (tennis) champions in boys' doubles
Olympic tennis players of Australia
Participants in American reality television series
Tennis players from Melbourne
Tennis players at the 1996 Summer Olympics
Tennis players at the 2000 Summer Olympics
Tennis players at the 2004 Summer Olympics
People educated at Wesley College (Victoria)
People from Williamstown, Victoria
Hopman Cup competitors
Wimbledon junior champions
Australian Institute of Sport tennis players
Living people